Meng Zixuan (born 18 November 1996) is a female Chinese volleyball player.

She participated at the 2015 FIVB Volleyball Women's U20 World Championship, and 2018 FIVB Volleyball Women's Nations League.

Clubs 

  Tianjin (2017 - present)

References

External links 

 FIVB profile
 FIVB youth profile
 
 https://www.jqknews.com/news/55212-Womens_volleyball_team_two_team_preparing_for_Asian_Cup_Tianjin_second_pass_Chen_Xintong_was_temporarily_asked_for.html

1994 births
Living people
Chinese women's volleyball players
Liberos
21st-century Chinese women